Jerseylicious was an American reality television show that premiered on March 21, 2010, on the now defunct Style Network. It chronicles the lives of six stylists who work at salons located in Green Brook Township, New Jersey. The Gatsby Salon, where the series is based upon, relaunched with a multimillion-dollar renovation and began hiring new employees in 2009, which included two of the main cast members: Tracy “Dimarco” Maloney and Olivia Blois Sharpe. Reruns of the series also air on Food Network (by Discovery Inc.).

The series was scheduled to return for its sixth season on October 6, 2013. However, it was announced that the Esquire Network would be taking over the Style Network rather than G4 as originally planned. The season later aired in countries where the Style Network still exists. Season 6 encompasses Olivia Blois Sharpe and Michelle DeCarlo as they pack their things and rent a summer house in Asbury Park, New Jersey. Tracy's wedding is also included. The show has now ended with Style Network being discontinued.

On August 26, 2014, Tracy “Dimarco” Maloney announced on her social networks that she was filming something for E! that was believed to be a spin-off show but ended up being for an E! True Hollywood Story special titled "Life After Reality" where she discussed her life now that Jerseylicious has ended.

Cast

Main 
 Tracy “Dimarco” Maloney: Former employee at The Gatsby Salon, The Glam Fairy, and Anthony Robert Salon. Currently partner with Princess Armor and co-hosts podcast Bad Examples with former Glam Fairy makeup artist and close friend, Jessica Romano-Calacione. Married to Corey Epstein from 2013 to 2019, currently in the process for divorce. They welcomed their first child, Skylar James, on  February 4, 2015, second child Jayden Gene on September 20, 2016, third child Julian Chase born in May 2018. Her son Julian is deaf and he has cochlear implants.
 Olivia Blois Sharpe: Makeup artist. Former employee at Anthony Robert Salon, The Gatsby Salon and The Glam Fairy. Now working on her own.
 Gigi Liscio: Hairstylist at The Gatsby Salon.
 Christy Pereira: Manager of The Gatsby Salon. Gayle Giacomo's daughter.
 Gayle Giacomo: Owner of The Gatsby Salon.
 Alexa Prisco: Former lead makeup artist at The Gatsby Salon, owner of The Glam Fairy. Married to Danny. Alexa was given her own spinoff, Glam Fairy. She gave birth to their first child, McKayla in December 2012.
 Anthony Lombardi: Owner of Anthony Robert Salon in Verona, New Jersey. Author of The Glamour State.

Recurring 

 Briella Calafiore: Hairdresser at Glam Fairy.
 Frankie Buglione Jr.: Gigi's ex-boyfriend 
 Filippo Giove Jr.: Former manager at the Anthony Robert Salon. Former Gatsby intern and assistant.
 Lorenzo Gangala (seasons 1–3): Gangala was never seen again on the series after his October 2011 arrest for assault.
 Jaclyn "Jackie" Bianchi (seasons 2–6): Olivia's childhood friend and stylist at Anthony Robert Salon.
 Doria Pagnotta (seasons 2–4): Makeup artist at The Gatsby Salon.
 Mike Aktari (seasons 2–4): Olivia's and Tracy's ex-boyfriend. (Aktari died at the age of 28 on March 13, 2017, from reasons unknown.)
 Michelle DeCarlo (seasons 3–6): Hairstylist at The Gatsby Salon.
 Catherine "Cathy" Giove (seasons 3–6): Former co-owner of the Anthony Robert Salon. Filippo's mother.
 Miguel Allure Rodriguez (seasons 3–6): Assistant stylist at The Gatsby Salon.
 Krystle Couso (seasons 3–4)
 Corey Epstein (seasons 4–6): Tracy's Husband
 Anthony Tango (seasons 4–5)
 Nick Alleva (seasons 5–6): Olivia's boyfriend

Episodes

Series overview

Season 1 (2010)

Season 2 (2010–2011)

Season 3 (2011)

Season 4 (2012)

Season 5 (2013)

Season 6 (2014)
Season 6 was not released on television after Style Network relaunched as Esquire Network. On June 18, 2017, Season 6 was made available on Food Network On Demand in the United States, UK and Europe.

Ratings
The series' premiere episode gained 300,000 total viewers and posted a 0.42 rating within the women 18-to-34 demographic. The season two finale rose to 925,000 viewers, the most-watched season-ender to-date of any series on the Style Network. The third season debut episode averaged 665,000 viewers. Season 4 premiered with a total of 668,000 viewers. 460,000 viewers watched the Season 5 finale.

Criticism of stereotypes 

Jerseylicious has been criticized by the Italian American ONE VOICE Coalition for its portrayals of crude 'Jersey Shore' stereotypes about Italian Americans. According to the ONE VOICE website, Jerseylicious and other related programs including Jersey Shore, The Real Housewives of New Jersey, Mob Wives, My Big Friggin' Wedding, Carfellows and Married a Mobster "have replaced fictitious characters with real low lifes, buffoons, carfoni and bimbos in the proliferation of reality shows" and turned anti-Italianism into "a global business."

International broadcasts 
Seasons 1-3 of the show aired on the Slovak TV WAU.
In the United Kingdom, the series is broadcast on ITVBe. Reruns of the show air also on E!.

References

2010s American reality television series
2010 American television series debuts
2013 American television series endings
English-language television shows
Television shows set in New Jersey
Television shows filmed in New Jersey
Television shows filmed in New York City
Television shows filmed in Texas
Television series by Endemol
Style Network original programming